This is a list of awards and nominations received by American actor and filmmaker Robert Duvall.

Major associations

Academy Awards

British Academy of Film and Television Arts (BAFTA) Awards

Emmy Awards (Primetime)

Golden Globe Awards

Screen Actors Guild Awards

Other awards and nominations

American Movie Awards

Blockbuster Entertainment Awards

Cable ACE Award

Chicago Film Critics Association

Critics' Choice Awards

Dallas-Fort Worth Film Critics Association

Deauville American Film Festival

Florida Film Critics Circle

Monte-Carlo Television Festival

Grace Award

Hollywood Film Awards

Independent Spirit Awards

Kansas City Film Critics Circle

Las Vegas Film Critics Society

Los Angeles Film Critics Association

Milan International Film Festival

Montréal World Film Festival

National Society of Film Critics

New York Film Critics Circle

New York International Independent Film and Video Festival

Pasinetti Award

Phoenix Film Critics Society

Satellite Awards

Society of Texas Film Critics

St. Louis Gateway Film Critics Association

Toronto Film Critics Association

Utah Film Critics Association

Washington D.C. Area Film Critics Association

National Cowboy and Western Heritage Museum

References

External links
 

Duvall, Robert